is a Japanese football player for Grulla Morioka.

Playing career
Yuma Takahashi joined to JEF Reserves in 2009. He moved to SAI Ichihara from July to August in 2010. In 2011, he moved to Sagawa Printing. In 2012, he moved to Grulla Morioka.

Club statistics
Updated to 23 February 2016.

References

External links

Profile at Football Lab

1990 births
Living people
Association football people from Chiba Prefecture
Japanese footballers
J3 League players
Japan Football League players
Vonds Ichihara players
SP Kyoto FC players
Iwate Grulla Morioka players
Association football midfielders